Dean Keith Simonton is a Distinguished Professor of Psychology at the University of California, Davis. He is particularly interested in the study of human intelligence, creativity, greatness, and the psychology of science.

Simonton was born on January 27, 1948, in Los Angeles (Glendale), California. He attended Occidental College, where he graduated in 1970 with a B.A. in psychology. He then attended Harvard University where he earned an M.A. (1973) and Ph.D. (1975), both in social psychology.

He has over 340 publications, including 13 books. One of his books, The Origins of Genius, received the William James Book Award.

One of his findings was that the 10 years' experience of deliberate practice is not a rule, but an average with significant variation around the mean. He found that the people who achieved the greatest lifetime productivity and highest levels of eminence required the least amount of time to achieve expertise. He also found that while too much expertise can hurt one's chances of greatness, the downsides of overtraining in one domain can be ameliorated by the acquisition of expertise among numerous different domains.

He also found that an association of creativity with psychopathic traits was more apparent in artists than in scientists, and that artists who operate in expressive, subjective, or romantic styles display more psychopathology than those who operate in classical or academic styles.

In 2006, he published a paper that ranked the IQ, Openness, Intellectual Brilliance, and Leadership of all past 42 US presidents.

Books

 Genius, creativity, and leadership: Historiometric inquiries	Harvard University Press, 1984 (out of print);
 Why presidents succeed: A political psychology of leadership	Yale University Press, 1987 (out of print);
 Scientific genius: A psychology of science	Cambridge University Press, 1988 (in print);
 Psychology, science, and history: An introduction to historiometry, Yale University Press, 1990 (out of print);
 Greatness: Who makes history and why	Guilford Press, 1994 (in print);
 Genius and creativity: Selected papers, Ablex (Praeger) Publishing, 1997 (in print);
 Origins of genius: Darwinian perspectives on creativity, Oxford University Press, 1999 (in print; ebook);
 Great psychologists and their times: Scientific insights into psychology's history, American Psychological Association, 2002 (out of print);
 Creativity in science: Chance, logic, genius, and zeitgeist, Cambridge University Press, 2004	(in print);
 Genius 101, Springer Publishing, 2009, (in print; ebook);
 Great flicks: Scientific studies of cinematic creativity and aesthetics, Oxford University Press, 2011 (in print; ebook);
 The social science of cinema (with J. C. Kaufman, co-editor), Oxford University Press, 2014 (in print, ebook);
 The Wiley handbook of genius (editor)	Wiley, 2014 (in print; ebook); plus

References

External links

Homepage
If You Think You’re a Genius, You’re Crazy

Living people
20th-century American psychologists
University of California, Davis faculty
Harvard University alumni
Fellows of the American Psychological Association
1948 births
21st-century American psychologists
American social psychologists
American textbook writers